Jiří Sýkora (born 1 July 1954) is a Czech long-distance runner. He competed in the men's 5000 metres at the 1980 Summer Olympics.

References

1954 births
Living people
Athletes (track and field) at the 1980 Summer Olympics
Czech male long-distance runners
Olympic athletes of Czechoslovakia
Place of birth missing (living people)